The 1952 United States presidential election in Idaho took place on November 4, 1952, as part of the 1952 United States presidential election. State voters chose four representatives, or electors, to the Electoral College, who voted for president and vice president.

Idaho was won by Columbia University President Dwight D. Eisenhower (R–New York), running with Senator Richard Nixon, with 65.42 percent of the popular vote, against Adlai Stevenson (D–Illinois), running with Senator John Sparkman, with 34.42 percent of the popular vote.

Results

Results by county

See also
 United States presidential elections in Idaho

References

Idaho
1952
1952 Idaho elections